meta-Chlorophenylbiguanide (1-(3-Chlorophenylbiguanide, ''m''-CPBG) is an allosteric agonist and modulator of the 5-HT3 receptor and an antagonist of the α2A-adrenergic receptor. It has anxiogenic, emetic and hypothermic effects in animal studies.

See also
 mCPP
 Bufotenidine (5-HTQ)

References

External links

5-HT3 agonists
Alpha-2 blockers
Emetics
Guanidines
Chloroarenes